Rank comparison chart of armies and land forces of Asian states.

Officers

Warrant officers

See also 
 Comparative army officer ranks of the Americas
 Ranks and insignia of NATO armies officers
 Comparative military ranks of Korea

Notes

References

Military comparisons